Brian Manning may refer to:

 Brian Manning (American football) (born 1975), American football wide receiver
 Brian Manning (historian) (1927–2004), British historian
 Brian Manning (politician), Trinidadian politician
 Brian Manning (trade unionist and activist) (1932–2013), Australian activist
 Brian G. W. Manning (1926–2011), British astronomer